Gbenga is a first name or surname among the Yoruba speaking tribe of Nigeria. It means "lift up" or "lift higher". It can also be translated to "Elevate". Gbenga may refer to:

Gbenga Adeboye (1959 – April 2003),  Nigerian entertainer
Gbenga Adeyinka, Nigerian comedian 
Ajayi Gbenga Samuel (born 1984), Nigerian footballer
Gbenga Akinnagbe (born 1978), American actor
Gbenga Aluko (born 20 July 1963), Nigerian politician 
Gbenga Arokoyo (born 1 November 1992), Nigerian footballer 
Gbenga Bareehu Ashafa (born 22 July 1955), Nigerian politician 
Gbenga Daniel (born 1956), Nigerian politician, Governor of Ogun State of Nigeria
Gbenga Elegbeleye (born 1 October 1964), Nigerian sports administrator and politician. 
Gbenga Ogunniya (born September 1949), Nigerian politician 
Gbenga Oloukun (born 1983), boxer from Nigeria
Gbenga Salu, video producer
Gbenga Sesan (born 1977), Nigeria's first Information Technology Youth Ambassador
Gbenga Shobo (born June 2, 1963), current Deputy Managing Director, First Bank of Nigeria Limited;
Gbenga Toyosi Olawepo (born 1965), Nigerian activist
Mike Gbenga, Nigerian TV personality and host of Focus on Africa

Yoruba given names